The Myth of the Framework: In Defence of Science and Rationality is a 1994 book by the philosopher Karl Popper. 

The book is a collection of papers "prepared on different occasions as lectures for non-specialist audiences" (p. x).  

The author formulates a premise for the book as:  I may be wrong and you may be right, and by an effort, we may get nearer to the truth (p. xii).

See also
 Critical rationalism
 Myth of the Given

Notes

References
 Karl R. Popper (1994). The Myth of the Framework: In Defence of Science and Rationality. Description & Contents, including excerpt of chapter 1, "The Rationality of Scientific Revolutions."  London and New York: Routledge.  
 _ (1987). "The Myth of the Framework," Rational Changes in Science: Essays on Scientific Reasoning, 98, pp. 35- 62. An earlier publication of ch. 2 above.  
  [Book review] (2011). "The Myth of the Framework: in defense [sic] of science and rationality, K.Popper Dec 18 - Dec 20, 2011," pp. 1-9              via http://www.chalmers.se/sv/institutioner/math/Sidor/default.aspx.
 Alexander Bird (1996). "The Myth of the Framework, by Karl Popper; Knowledge and the Body: Mind Problem by Karl Popper," British Journal for the Philosophy of Science, 47(1), pp. 149-151.
 Alan Forrester (2010). "The Myth of the Framework," critical rationalism blog, October 3.

Books by Karl Popper
1994 non-fiction books 
Analytic philosophy literature
Books about liberalism
English-language books
Philosophy of science literature
Political philosophy literature
Routledge books